The Congregation of the Apostolic Carmel - Karnataka Province is a catholic women's congregation situated in Mangalore in the state of Karnataka, India. It was established in the year 1870 by three Catholic nuns from France of the order of Sisters of the Apostolic Carmel.

Educational institutions 
The educational institutions under Congregation of the Apostolic Carmel are:

Higher Education
St. Agnes College, Mangaluru (1921)
Carmel College, Modankap, Bantwal (2010)

Professional Education
 St Ann's Teacher Training Institute, Mangaluru (1890)
 St. Ann's College of Education, Mangaluru (1943)
 St Agnes Teacher Training Institute for Special Education, Mangaluru (1992)
 St Ann's Diploma in Pre Primary Education, Mangaluru (2005)
 Carmel D.Ed. College, Bidar (2009)

Vocational / Community Colleges
 St. Agnes Vocational Training Centre, Mangaluru (1990)
 Vijaymari Technical Institute, Mangaluru (1965)
 Carmel Vocational Training Institute, Bidar (1999)
 Community College, Vijaymari (2006)

Pre University Colleges
 St. Agnes PU College, Mangalore (1920)
 St. Ann's Composite P.U. College, Mangaluru (1997)
 Ladyhill Victoria Composite P.U. College, Urwa (1999)
 Carmel Composite P.U. College, Modankap (2000)
 St. Cecily's Composite P.U. College, Udupi (2002)
 Holy Rosary Composite P.U. College, Moodbidri (2002)
 St. Mary's Composite P.U. College, Falnir (2002)

Secondary schools
 St. Ann's High School, Mangalore (1870)
 St. Agnes High School, Mangaluru (1921)
 Ladyhill Victoria Girls High School, Urwa, Mangaluru (1921)
 St. Cecily's High School, Udupi (1933)
 St. Joseph's High School, Kundapura (1946)
 St. Mary's High School, Mangaluru (1948)
 Carmel Girls’ High School, Modankap, Bantwal (1963)
 Holy Rosary High School, Moodbidri (1964)
 Stella Maris High School, Gangulli (1966)
 Carmel High School, Kemmanu (1971)
 Vidya Jyothi High School, Kunjathbail, Mangaluru (2008)

Kannada Higher Primary Schools
 St. Ann's Higher Primary School, Mangaluru (1873)
 Ladyhill Higher Primary School, Urwa, Mangaluru (1885)
 St. Mary's Higher Primary School, Mangaluru (1895)
 St. Cecily's Higher Primary School, Udupi (1918)
 St. Joseph's Higher Primary School, Kundapura (1930)
 St. Philomena Higher Primary School, Kemmanu (1933)
 Stella Maris Higher Primary School, Someshwar, Kotekar (1937)
 Infant Jesus Higher Primary School, Kavoor, Mangaluru (1939)
 St. Agnes Higher Primary School, Mangaluru (1946)
 Vidya Jyothi Higher Primary, Kunjathbail, Mangaluru (1989)

English Medium Secondary Schools
 Mary Immaculate School, Bengaluru (1958)
 Carmel English School, Nanjangud (1968)
 St. Joseph's School, Mysuru (1970)
 Carmel Vidya Vikas School, Bailhongal, Belagavi (2005)
 Little Flower School, Lingsugur (2005)
 Carmel School, Kotekar (2006)
 Carmel English School, Kemmannu (2006)
 Stella Maris English School, Gangulli (2007)

English Medium Higher Primary Schools
 St. Cecily's English Higher Primary School, Udupi (1959)
 St. Mary's English Higher Primary School, Falnir, Mangaluru (1961)
 Ladyhill English Higher Primary School, Urwa, Mangaluru (1965)
 Carmel English Higher Primary School (1964)
 St. Agnes English Higher Primary School (1965)

CBSE Schools
 Carmel School, Mangaluru (2013)
 St. Agnes School, Mangaluru (2015)
 Mount Carmel Central School, Maryhill, Mangaluru (2008)
 Carmel School, Moodbidri (2013)

ICSE School
 Mary Immaculate School, Bengaluru (2012/2013)

Special Education
 St. Agnes Special School, Mangaluru (1970)
 Carmel Vidya Vikas Residential School for the Mentally Challenged Children, Bailhongal, Belagavi (1999)

Preparatory Schools
 Mary Immaculate Preparatory School, Bengaluru (1958)
 St. Cecily's Preparatory School, Udupi (1959)
 Ladyhill Preparatory School, Urwa, Mangaluru (1959)
 St. Mary's Preparatory School, Falnir, Mangaluru (1959)
 St. Agnes Preparatory School, Bendore, Mangaluru (1965)
 Shanthi Nilaya Preparatory School, Nanjangud (1967)
 St. Joseph's Preparatory School, Mysuru (1969)
 Stella Maris Preparatory School, Someshwar, Kotekar (2004)
 Carmel Preparatory School, Kemmannu (2005)
 Carmel Vidya Vikas Preparatory School, Bailhongal, Belgaum (2005)
 Little Flower Preparatory School, Lingsugur (2005)
 Stella Maris Preparatory School, Gangulli (2007)

References

Discalced Carmelite Order
Catholic teaching orders
Carmelite spirituality
Catholic female orders and societies
Catholic religious orders established in the 19th century